John Bourchier, 1st Baron Berners, KG (died May 1474) was an English peer.

Bourchier was the fourth son of William Bourchier, 1st Count of Eu, and his wife Anne of Woodstock, Countess of Buckingham, daughter of Thomas of Woodstock, 1st Duke of Gloucester. Henry Bourchier, 1st Earl of Essex, and William Bourchier, 9th Baron FitzWarin jure uxoris, were his elder brothers. 

He was knighted in 1426 and in 1455 he was summoned to the House of Lords as John Bourchier de Berners, which created the title of Baron Berners. In 1459 he was further honoured when he was made a Knight of the Garter. He also served as Constable of Windsor Castle from 1461 to 1474.

Lord Berners married Margery Berners (died 18 December 1475), daughter of Sir Richard Berners and Philippe Dalyngride, daughter of Sir Edward Dalyngridgge. 

He died in May 1474 and was succeeded in the barony by his grandson John Bourchier, 2nd Baron Berners, his son Sir Humphrey Bourchier having been killed at the Battle of Barnet in 1471. Margery, Lady Berners, died in 1475. His daughter Joan Bourchier married Sir Henry Neville (died 26 July 1469), son of George Neville, 1st Baron Latimer and Elizabeth Beauchamp, and had issue which included Richard Neville, 2nd Baron Latimer, father of John Nevill, 3rd Baron Latimer. 

His daughter, Elizabeth Bourchier (d. 1470), married Robert Welles, 8th Baron Willoughby de Eresby and survived him by only a few months, and was buried by his side in the church of the Whitefriars in Doncaster. She left a will dated 2 October 1470.

John Bourchier was buried at Chertsey Abbey, in the Runnymede borough of Surrey

Ancestry

References 

 Kidd, Charles, Williamson, David (editors). Debrett's Peerage and Baronetage (1990 edition). New York: St Martin's Press, 1990.
 

Year of birth missing
1474 deaths
John Bourchier, 1st Baron Berners
Knights of the Garter
1